Rhodomelaceae is estimated to be the largest red algae family, with about 125 genera and over 700 species.

Included taxa
Rhodomelaceae includes the following tribes and genera:

Incertae sedis:

References

 
Red algae families